A "pound of flesh" was demanded as payment by the character Shylock in William Shakespeare's The Merchant of Venice, which may have taken the idea from the earlier Il Pecorone.

Pound of Flesh may also refer to:
 Pound of Flesh (2015 film), a 2015 action film starring Jean-Claude Van Damme
 Pound of Flesh (2010 film), a crime film starring Malcolm McDowell 
 "Pound of Flesh", an episode of the 2009 TV series V
 A Pound of Flesh, a module for the sci-fi horror roleplaying game Mothership
"A Pound of Flesh", a chapter from Thane Rosenbaum's 2004 book The Myth of Moral Justice

See also 
 A Pound of Flesh for 50p, a 2014 art installation by Alex Chinneck